This is a list of members of the Parliament of the German-speaking Community between 2004 and 2009, following the direct elections of 2004.

Composition

Sources
 

List
2000s in Belgium